Surprise is the first album released by Lynsey de Paul on the MAM record label in 1973. In Australia, the album name was changed to Sugar Me, after de Paul's first hit single. All of the songs on the album were written or co-written by de Paul (half the tracks were re-recordings of her songwriting demos), who was accompanied by some of the UK's leading session musicians including Terry Cox, Ralph McTell, Ray Cooper, Jeff Daly, John Gustafson, Chris Rae, Danny Thompson, Gary Boyle, Barry de Souza, Dick Katz, Robert Kirby, Francis Monkman, John Richardson (who would later become the drummer in The Rubettes) and violinist Johnny Van Derrick. The album front cover is a  portrait photo of de Paul photographed by Clive Arrowsmith, and a gatefold sleeve with illustrations provided by de Paul, a nod to her previous career of designing album sleeves and song lyrics. It received favourable reviews from the mainstream music press with adverts proclaiming "the first album from this enormously talented artist" being placed in most of them. Gramophone stated "she has a neatly effective knack of songwriting and puts the numbers across in a competent manner. The Sunday Herald wrote "...her first album, Surprise, demonstrated a ready facility for melody and catchy hooks, but also a knack for sidestepping the most predictable pop clichés." Record Mirror stated "Surprise for many. They said she was a Top 50 single maker. Album with many goodies. Not a dull track. Sexy as well".

Surprisingly, her debut single "Sugar Me" was re-recorded for this album and has a much longer fade out with de Paul being the producer on this version rather than Gordon Mills, who produced the hit single version. This song was covered by many artists over the years, most notably in the United States by Nancy Sinatra and Claudine Longet. Another surprise was that neither the recent follow up hit "Getting a Drag" nor the third single "All Night" (released just one month after the "Surprise") were included on the LP. Although no other tracks were released by de Paul from the album as singles in the UK, Europe and US, the track "Water" was released as "Agua" in Chile and Peru, with "Rockerdile" as the B-side. The album's last track "Just Visiting" sees de Paul speculate that spacemen visited prehistoric man and gave continued guidance in mankind's development and that we might find ourselves in the same position, a theme taken up by Chris de Burgh in his later song "A Spaceman Came Travelling". "Just Visiting" was included on the French duo Pilooski & Pentile's (aka Discodeine) guest mix released to promote their album Swimmer (2013).

De Paul performed live versions of some of the tracks from the album on television including Top of the Pops (and an album was released to BBC radio stations around the world containing these tracks), as well as on the first episode of the German TV program, Musikladen performing "Sugar Me", and later on episode 5 performing "Doctor, Doctor". She also performed "Sleeping Blue Nights" on the German TV program Hits-a-Go-Go on 24 June 1973. Other promotion work included a lengthy interview with de Paul, as well as airplay of featured album tracks on Japanese radio (Nippon Viva Turtle Show).

Many of the tracks on Surprise were also recorded by other artists. The jazz tinged "Mama Do" was covered by a number of artists with slightly different lyrics and with the title "Papa Do", notably by Barry Green - this version reached number 68 on the French singles chart. It was also released as a single by Greek group "The Daltons" and also as an album track by the group "Cardinal Point". "Ivory Tower" (co-written with Elizabeth Sacks in 1971 was released as a single by singer-songwriter Caroline Hall in 1973. "Crossword Puzzle" was recorded and released as a single by Dana Rosemary Scallon) and Dana sang the song on Top of the Pops and also on Saturday Variety, a prime time BBC1 series on 8 July 1972. This version of the song reached number 2 on the Bangkok singles chart in September 1972 as reported in Billboard. "Rockerdile" was recorded and released as a B-side to the de Paul/Blue penned single "Mona" by Winston. and a Japanese version was released as the B-side to a single by Fumiko Ishida, "Sleeping Blue Nights" was recorded and released by Zig-Zag and, most recently, Barry Blue, the song's co-writer, released his version on a four CD compilation album. In an interview with Melody Maker about the Surprise album, de Paul revealed that White Plains recorded a version of "The Way It Goes".

More recently, Japanese artist Nickey recorded a version of "Water", which was the last track on her 2013 album A Taste on Honey. Smoove & Turrell borrowed from the backing track to "Water" on their single "You Don't Know" and its various remixes in 2009, with permission from de Paul, who also received a writing credit for the song. This version was included on their 2019 greatest hits album Solid Brass: Ten Years of Northern Funk. The British rap artist Twiggz also released the song in 2018 completely with new spoken vocals, but featuring the de Paul backing track and her vocals repeating "Water". "Sugar Me", the album's international hit single has been covered by over 20 artists including Nancy Sinatra, Claudine Longet and Nydia Caro.

In 2005, the album was released on CD for the first time in Japan on the AIRAC label, and featured the following additional bonus tracks on a second CD: "Storm in a Teacup", "Getting a Drag", "Brandy", "All Night", "Blind Leading the Blind", "Won't Somebody Dance with Me", and "So Good To You" i.e. all four hit singles and B-sides recorded for the MAM Records label. It also featured the original gatefold sleeve artwork cover. In February 2020, a CD version of the album with the original track listing as the LP was released in Russia.

Surprise is considered one of the best albums of 1973, and it was listed as such in the German music book "Rock Musiker". More recently it was featured as the "Album of the Day" on the music site Todaysalbum, on 1 October 2017. Online site Best ever albums, list Surprise as one of the top albums released in 1973, as well as one of the top 1000 albums released in the 1970s. It was featured as one of the choices for best albums for Record Store Day by the Italian newspaper la Repubblica in 2011. Tracks from the album are still played on American radio.

Track listing
All tracks composed by Lynsey de Paul; except where indicated
A side
 "Mama Do" (de Paul, Barry Ian Green)
 "Ivory Tower" (de Paul, Liz Sacks)
 "Doctor Doctor" 
 "Crossword Puzzle" (de Paul, Barry Ian Green)
 "Water" (de Paul, Barry Ian Green)

B side
 "Sleeping Blue Nights" (de Paul, Barry Ian Green)
 "The Way It Goes" (de Paul, Malcolm Roberts)
 "Rockerdile" (de Paul, Barry Ian Green)
 "Sugar Me" (de Paul, Barry Ian Green)
 "Just Visiting"

Personnel
Lynsey de Paul - vocals, piano
Gary Boyle, Chris Ray - electric guitar 
Ralph McTell - acoustic guitar on "Ivory Tower"
Johnny Gustafson, Frank McDonald - bass
Danny Thompson - string bass on "Ivory Tower"
Peter Robinson - electric piano, organ 
Dave Grounds - electric piano
Dick Katz - additional piano on "Water"
Francis Monkman - harpsichord on "Ivory Tower"
Robert Kirby - string arrangement on "Ivory Tower"
Terry Cox, Barry de Souza, John Richardson - drums, percussion
Ray Cooper, Frank Ricotti, Morris Pert - percussion
Jeff Daly - saxophone, flute, brass
Alan Skidmore, Henry Lowther, Geoff Wright, Mike Bailey - brass
Johnny Van Derrek - violin on "Sugar Me"
Technical
Peter Coleman - production engineer
Lynsey de Paul - album design
Clive Arrowsmith - cover photography

References

1973 debut albums
Lynsey de Paul albums
albums arranged by Robert Kirby